Marta Mangué González (born 23 April 1983) is a Spanish handballer for Bourg-de-Péage Drôme Handball and the Spanish national team.

She was part of the Spanish team that won the bronze medal at the 2012 Summer Olympics. 

Mangué played for ŽRK Zaječar for one and a half seasons, however, due to financial reasons the Serbian club let her go in mid-December 2012.

Mangué competed at the 2004 Summer Olympics in Athens, where the Spanish team reached the quarter finals, and finished 6th in the tournament.

She won a gold medal with the Spanish team at the 2005 Mediterranean Games in Almería.

Mangué played at the 2008 European Women's Handball Championship in Macedonia, where the Spanish team defeated Germany in the semifinal, and received silver medals after losing the final. Mangué ended up among the top ten goalscorers at the tournament.

At the 2011 World Championships, Mangué was part of the first Spanish women's team to win a medal at world level.  Spain followed this up with an Olympic bronze in 2012 and a European silver in 2014.

Personal life
Mangué is bisexual. In September 2016, she became a mother after her partner gave birth to a child.

References

External links

1983 births
Living people
Sportspeople from Las Palmas
Spanish sportspeople of Equatoguinean descent
Spanish female handball players
Olympic handball players of Spain
Handball players at the 2004 Summer Olympics
Olympic medalists in handball
Handball players at the 2012 Summer Olympics
Handball players at the 2016 Summer Olympics
Olympic bronze medalists for Spain
Medalists at the 2012 Summer Olympics
Competitors at the 2005 Mediterranean Games
Mediterranean Games gold medalists for Spain
Expatriate handball players
Spanish expatriate sportspeople in Denmark
Spanish expatriate sportspeople in France
Spanish expatriate sportspeople in Serbia
Bisexual sportspeople
Bisexual women
LGBT handball players
Spanish LGBT sportspeople
Mediterranean Games medalists in handball
21st-century Spanish women